The Thiel Detective Service Company was a private detective agency formed in 1873 by George H. Thiel, a former Civil War spy and Pinkerton employee.

The Thiel Detective Service Company headquarters were in St. Louis, Missouri. The company was formed to be a direct competitor to the Pinkerton Detective Agency, but never achieved this status. The Burns Detective Agency was Pinkerton's largest competitor. By the late 1890s, Thiel had seven offices, including one in New York and one in Portland, Oregon.

Many of the agents employed by Thiel spied on railroad workers, covering every state and territory in the Union, as well as Canadian provinces between Vancouver Island and Nova Scotia. They referred to themselves as "testers", meaning that they tested employees' honesty, while railroad workers called them "spotters".

The Thiel Agency was also involved in infiltrating and breaking a number of labor union strikes in the United States and Canada, much as the Pinkerton agency was. After the Homestead Strike, the Thiel Detective Agency, along with the Illinois Detective Agency, U.S. Detective Agency, and Mooney and Boland's Detective Agency were investigated by both chambers of the United States Congress.

One of the company's first employees was John F. Farley, a former United States Cavalry trooper. In 1885, Farley was appointed manager of Thiel's Denver office. Farley later served as Chief of Police in Denver for two spells: 1889–1893, 1897–1901. By 1914 Farley was assistant general manager of the Thiel Detective Service Company. From his office in San Francisco he had jurisdiction over the offices in Los Angeles, Portland, Seattle and Vancouver.

See also
 Murder of workers in labor disputes in the United States

Notes

References
 Dorich, Thomas J. "This Is a Tough Place to Work: Industrial Relations in the Jerome Mines, 1900–1922." Journal of Arizona History. 38 (Autumn 1997).
 Morn, Frank. The Eye That Never Sleeps: A History of the Pinkerton National Detective Agency. Bloomington: Indiana University Press, 1982. 
 Weiss, Robert P. "Private Detective Agencies and Labour Discipline in the United States, 1855–1946." Historical Journal. 29:1 (March 1986).

Private detectives and investigators
History of labor relations in the United States
Labor detectives